Mariama Souley Bana (born 21 January 1987) is a Nigerien female swimmer. Bana competed for Niger at the 2008 Summer Olympics in Swimming. She finished in the 8th and final place in heat two in the Women's 50 metre freestyle.

References

1987 births
Living people
Nigerien female swimmers
Olympic swimmers of Niger
Swimmers at the 2008 Summer Olympics
Nigerien female freestyle swimmers